Euphaedra barnsi is a butterfly in the family Nymphalidae. It is found in the Democratic Republic of the Congo (Kivu) and Rwanda.

Similar species
Other members of the Euphaedra zaddachii species group q.v.

References

Butterflies described in 1983
barnsi